Guatemala at the Pan American Games.Guatemala has competed in all the Pan American Games.

Medal count

References